Perkins Engines Company Limited, a subsidiary of Caterpillar Inc since 1998, is primarily a diesel engine manufacturer for several markets including agricultural, construction, material handling, power generation, and industrial.  It was established in Peterborough, England in 1932. Over the years Perkins has expanded its engine catalogue, producing thousands of different engine specifications including diesel and petrol engines.

History

High-speed diesel engines

F. Perkins Limited, established on 7 June 1932, was founded by Frank Perkins and Charles Wallace Chapman, on Queen Street, Peterborough, to design and manufacture high-speed diesel engines. Chapman was the design engineer (technical director) and company secretary and had a ten percent shareholding in the company. He continued working at F. Perkins Limited for more than a decade before re-joining the Royal Navy Reserve, though remaining a consultant to the company. Frank Perkins obtained further initial support from directors Alan J. M. Richardson and George Dodds Perks.

Before Chapman and Perkins, the diesel engine was considered a heavy and slow-revving workhorse, lacking performance. Chapman's concept was the high-speed diesel – an engine that could challenge petrol-driven ones as the primary motor power.  The company's first high-speed diesel engine was Perkins' four-cylinder Vixen, which made its debut in 1932. In October 1935, Perkins became the first company to hold six world diesel speed records for a variety of distances, set at the Brooklands race track in Surrey. Sales were strong and by the time of World War II, the company made two series of engines, P4 and P6. Soon after the war, the company went public, and established a number of licensees for local manufacturing and sale.

Massey Ferguson
F. Perkins Ltd was purchased by its largest customer, Massey Ferguson, in 1959. Keeping its separate identity, the business continued under the name of Perkins Engines and in 1994 became a subsidiary of LucasVarity. Development continued and Perkins updated its engines to meet stricter emissions rules while developing new engine series for power generation and forklift trucks. Manufacturers such as Dodge, Ford, Grosspal, and Ranquel used Perkins engines in their diesel-driven products for more than two decades. Other manufacturers including GEMA, Araus, Bernardin and Rotania used Perkins impellers for harvesters at length.

Argentina and Perkins Argentina/Pertrak
Pertrak was founded in 1961 as a licensee of Perkins Engines of England, and was dedicated to the manufacture of engines for pickups, trucks, and tractors. The most productive period for the company was in the 1970s when they produced 200,000 engines. In 2010, the last engine was made in Ferreyra, Córdoba, when the license was dropped. Throughout this period of almost 40 years, more than 500,000 engines were produced. The factory continues to make engine parts for other makes such as Fiat and Scania.

Caterpillar
Perkins now has manufacturing facilities in the United Kingdom, United States, Brazil, China, India, and a joint venture with Ishikawajima-Shibaura-Machinery company in Japan.

On 1 June 2018, Steve Ferguson became President of Perkins Engines, replacing Ramin Younessi, after having worked as the general manager of Caterpillar's Advanced Component Manufacturing Department and overseeing operations at 15 global facilities. Ferguson is a vice-president of Caterpillar.

Discontinued products
Various Perkins diesel engines have been made for industrial, agricultural, construction, material handling, marine and power generation markets, and Perkins gas-based engines (natural gas, landfill gas, digester gas, bio gas and mine gas) are used for continuous power generation.

Perkins engines were also used as standard factory equipment in Jeeps and Dodge trucks in the United States in the 1960s. They also continued to be popular in European trucks from their original customer, Commer and other companies.

The Perkins 6.354 medium duty engine was designed to be compact enough to replace petrol/gasoline V8 engines in trucks, despite its in-line six-cylinder design. Producing  in early years (later rising to 120-hp), it had a small jackshaft driven by the timing gears for the auxiliary drive, with the oil pump driven by a quill shaft so it could run auxiliary equipment at engine speed with simple couplings.

Until 2004 Perkins manufactured engines for JCB, but since then JCB manufactures their own engines.

Acquisitions
After acquiring Rolls-Royce Diesels of Shrewsbury in 1984, Perkins continued to supply British Rail with engines for its diesel multiple units. Perkins went on to purchase L Gardner & Sons in the summer of 1986 to complement their line of lighter diesel engines.

Perkins Powered Equipment 

Perkins engines are found in a wide range of machinery including tractors, generators, industrial tools, and machinery. While Perkins has customers in many sectors, the main consumer of their engines is Caterpillar, who is also their parent company. Caterpillar has several divisions that consume Perkins engines, the main two being Caterpillar Excavators and Caterpillar Diesel Generators through their subsidiary, F G Wilson. Perkins also has a subsidiary named Perkins Marine, which produces small engines for marine propulsion.

See also
List of Perkins engines

References

External links

 
Caterpillar Inc. subsidiaries
Diesel engine manufacturers
Electrical generation engine manufacturers
Marine engine manufacturers
Manufacturing companies established in 1932
Companies based in Cambridgeshire
Companies based in Peterborough
British companies established in 1932
1932 establishments in England
1998 mergers and acquisitions
Gas engine manufacturers